
Year 307 BC was a year of the pre-Julian Roman calendar. At the time, it was known as the Year of the Consulship of Caecus and Violens (or, less frequently, year 447 Ab urbe condita). The denomination 307 BC for this year has been used since the early medieval period, when the Anno Domini calendar era became the prevalent method in Europe for naming years.

Events 
 By place 

 Babylonia 
 Antigonus makes peace with Seleucus, who is left free to consolidate his kingdom.
 Antigonus founds the city of  Antigonia (Syria)

 Greece 
 The governor (despot) of Athens for 10 years and supporter of Cassander, Demetrius Phalereus, is obliged to flee from Athens on the approach of the Macedonian prince, Demetrius Poliorcetes. He settles in Alexandria 
 Demetrius Poliorcetes re-establishes the old Athenian constitution. The grateful Athenians honour Antigonus and Demetrius as divine saviours.
 Upon becoming ruler of Epirus, Pyrrhus allies himself with his brother-in-law, Demetrius Poliorcetes, son of Antigonus.

 Sicily 
 The tyrant of Syracuse, Agathocles is forced to return to Syracuse to deal with growing unrest in his Sicilian dominions. Those of Agathocles' army that remain behind in Carthage are soon destroyed.
 The Carthaginian general Hamilcar fails to take Syracuse and is captured and killed.
 The city of Segesta in Sicily is destroyed by Agathocles.

 China 
 The Chinese King Wuling of Zhao reforms the military of the State of Zhao by putting more emphasis on cavalry over charioteers.

 By topic 

 Philosophy 
 Epicureanism, a system of philosophy based upon the teachings of Epicurus, is founded (approximate date).

Births

Deaths

References